Robert Taleanu (born 9 July 1979) is a Romanian luger. He competed in the men's doubles event at the 2002 Winter Olympics.

References

External links
 

1979 births
Living people
Romanian male lugers
Olympic lugers of Romania
Lugers at the 2002 Winter Olympics
People from Bușteni